Boca Chica is a municipality in the Dominican Republic.

Boca Chica or Bocachica or variation, may also refer to:

Places
Boca Chica, Chiriquí, a village in Panama, on the Gulf of Chiriqui
Boca Chica Island, in the Gulf of Chiriqui; an island of Panama
Boca Chica Key, an island in the Florida Keys, of Florida, USA
 Boca Chica Field at Naval Air Station Key West
 Boca Chica Beach, on Boca Chica Key
 Boca Chica Road, on the Overseas Highway
Boca Chica (Texas), a peninsula in the state of Texas, USA
Boca Chica Beach, a beach on the peninsula
Boca Chica Village, Texas, a village near Boca Chica Beach
Texas State Highway 4, known locally as Boca Chica Boulevard
SpaceX South Texas launch site, part of the Boca Chica Spaceport
SpaceX Boca Chica resort, a resort in planning stage  near Boca Chica Beach
 Port of Boca Chica, Boca Chica, Dominican Republic
 Bocachica channel, Cartagena Bay, Cartagena, Colombia

People
 César Bocachica (born 1938), Puerto Rican basketball player
 Hiram Bocachica (born 1976), Puerto Rican baseball player

Other uses
 Several forts and batteries in Columbia; see List of National Monuments of Colombia

See also

 Castle of San Luis de Bocachica, Caragena, Columbia
 Boca grande (disambiguation); "Boca Chica" means 'small mouth' in Spanish
 
 
 
 
 Chico (disambiguation)
 Chica (disambiguation)
 Boca (disambiguation)